The 1857 Dallas mayoral election was the second mayoral election in Dallas, Texas. The election was held sometime between late 1857-1858. John M. Crockett won the election, becoming mayor.

References

Mayoral elections in Dallas